WYWH may refer to:

 WYWH-LP, a low-power radio station (104.5 FM) licensed to Athens, Ohio, United States
 WYWH, a 2010 album by The Concretes, or the title song
 Wish You Were Here (disambiguation), several uses